

The Carnegie Collection of British Music was founded in 1917 by the Carnegie Trust to encourage the publication of large scale British musical works. Composers were asked to submit their manuscripts to an anonymous panel. On the panel at various times were Hugh Allen, Granville Bantock, Arnold Bax, Dan Godfrey, Henry Hadow and Donald Tovey. Up to six works per year were chosen for an award – publication at the expense of the Trust, in conjunction with music publishers Stainer & Bell. Unfortunately the war delayed things for the earliest prizewinners. The first to be published (in 1918) was the Piano Quartet in A minor by Herbert Howells. (It caught the attention of the young William Walton, who successfully submitted his own Piano Quartet to the panel six years later). By the end of 1920 some 13 works were available. 30 were out by the end of 1922, and when the scheme finally closed in 1928 some 60 substantial works that might not otherwise have seen the light of day had been issued under the Carnegie Collection of British Music imprint.

Not all the works published were new and unknown. Some, such as Vaughan Williams' London Symphony and Rutland Boughton's opera The Immortal Hour were already long established pieces. Stanford's Fifth Symphony, composed almost 30 years before, hadn't kept its place in the repertoire, but was published in recognition of the influential composer and teacher at the very end of his life. Ernest Farrar, who died in 1918, was posthumously awarded publications in 1921 and 1925. However, many of the lesser known works and their composers have been all but forgotten today. A collection of most (over 50) of the scores is held at the Maughan Library (part of King's College London) on the Strand.

In 1995 the BBC broadcast three programmes on the Carnegie Collection, providing the first modern recordings of some of the most neglected works. These included Edgar Bainton's Before Sunrise, Norman Hay's String Quartet in A, Ina Boyle's The Magic Harp, R O Morris' Quartet in A, Lawrence Collingwood's Poeme symphonique, Edward Mitchell's Fantasy Overture and John McEwan's Solway Symphony.

Scores published

Edgar Bainton 
 Concerto Fantasia, piano and orchestra (1920) 
 Before Sunrise, symphony for contralto solo, chorus, and orchestra (1922)
Granville Bantock 
 Hebridean Symphony (1915, published 1920)
Herbert Bedford 
 Night Piece No 2 (The Shepherd), for voice (contralto or mezzo), flute, oboe, and piano (1925)
Arthur Benjamin 
 Pastoral Fantasy, for string quartet (1924)
Arthur Bliss
 Rhapsody for flute, cor anglais, string quartet, bass and two voices, soprano and tenor (1921)
Rutland Boughton 
 The Immortal Hour, music-drama (1914, published 1923)
York Bowen 
 String Quartet No 2 in D minor, op 41 (1922)
Ina Boyle 
 The Magic Harp, orchestral rhapsody (1919, published 1922)
Sam Hartley Braithwaite 
 Snow Picture, for orchestra (1924) 
 Elegy, for orchestra (1927)
Frank Bridge 
 The Sea, suite for orchestra (1910–11, published 1920)
Alan Bush
 String Quartet in A minor, op 4 (1925) 
Lawrence Collingwood
 Poeme Symphonique, for orchestra (1918, published 1921)
Learmont Drysdale
 Tam o’Shanter, concert overture (1891, published 1921)
Thomas Dunhill
 The Enchanted Garden, opera in one act, op 65 (1925)
George Dyson
 Three Rhapsodies, for string quartet, op 7 (1920)
David Evans
 Concerto for String Orchestra, op 7 (1928)
Harry Farjeon
 St Dominic Mass, for choir, orchestra, solo soprano, tenor and solo violin, op 51 (1923)
 Phantasy Concerto, for piano and chamber orchestra, op 64 (1926) 
Ernest Farrar
 English Pastoral Impressions, suite for orchestra (1921)
 Three Spiritual Studies, for string orchestra, op 33 (1925) 
Gerald Finzi
 A Severn Rhapsody, for chamber orchestra (1924)
Nicholas Gatty
 Prince Ferelon, or, The Princess’s Suitors: a musical extravaganza in one act
Cecil Armstrong Gibbs
 The Blue Peter: a comic opera in one act (1925)
Ivor Gurney
 The Western Playland: song-cycle for baritone voice, string quartet and piano (1926)
 Ludlow and Teme, song-cycle for tenor voice, string quartet and piano (1919)
W H Harris
 The Hound of Heaven, for baritone solo, chorus & orchestra (1919)
Edward Norman Hay
 String Quartet in A major (1920)
Victor Hely-Hutchinson
 Variations, Intermezzo, Scherzo & Finale, for orchestra (1927)
Gustav Holst
 The Hymn of Jesus, for two choruses, semi-chorus and full orchestra, op 37 (1919)
Herbert Howells
 Piano Quartet in A minor, op 21 (1918)
 Rhapsodic Quintet, clarinet quintet, op 31 (1921)
John Blackwood McEwen
 Solway Symphony (1911, published 1922)
Jeffrey Mark
 Scottish Suite, for violins and piano (1928)
Percy Hilder Miles
 Sextet in G minor (1920)
Robin Milford
 Double Fugue for Orchestra, op 10 (1927)
Edward Mitchell
 Fantasy Overture, for orchestra (with six horns) (1922)
R O Morris
 Fantasy, for string quartet (1922)
Cyril Rootham
 Brown Earth, for chorus and orchestra (1922-3, published 1929)
 Ode on the Morning of Christ’s Nativity, for chorus and orchestra (1927-8, published 1929)
Alec Rowley
 The Princess Who Lost a Tune, ballet-mime (1927)
Cyril Scott
 Nativity Hymn, for chorus and orchestra (1923)
 Piano Quintet [No. 1] (1920, published 1925)
Charles Villiers Stanford
 Symphony No 5 in D major (1894, published 1923)
 The Travelling Companion, opera in four acts, op 146 (1916, published 1925)
Ralph Vaughan Williams
 A London Symphony (1914, published 1920)
Alfred M Wall
 Quartet for Piano & Strings in C minor (1920)
William Walton
 Piano Quartet in A minor (1924)
Peter Warlock
 The Curlew, song cycle for tenor solo, flute, English horn, and string quartet (1924)
Felix Harold White
 The Nymph’s Complaint for oboe (or violin), viola & piano (1922)
 Four Proverbs, for flute, oboe violin, viola and cello (1925)
W G Whittaker
 Among the Northumbrian Hills, free variations on an original theme for piano and string quartet (1922)
 A Lyke-Wake Dirge, for chorus and orchestra (1925)
Stanley Wilson
 A Skye Symphony, op 38 (1928)
Leslie Woodgate
 Two Hymns, for baritone solo, men’s voices, strings, piano and organ (1923)
 'A Hymn to the Virgin' (words, anon.)
 'The White Island' (words Herrick)

Further reading
New works by modern British composers, Carnegie UK Trust
 First series (Percy Scholes, 1921)
 Second series (Scholes, 1924)
 Third series (W R Anderson, 1928)

References

External links
 King's College London, Individual Collections: The Carnegie Collection of British Music

English classical composers
19th-century classical composers
20th-century classical composers
20th-century British composers
19th-century British composers
British music awards
Awards established in 1917
Music publishing companies of the United Kingdom
Music publishing
1917 establishments in the United Kingdom